Christophia climacopterae is a species of snout moth in the genus Christophia. It was described by Mark I. Falkovitsh in 1999 and is known from Kazakhstan.

The larvae have been recorded feeding on Climacoptera crassa.

References

Moths described in 1999
Phycitini